"Letter from a Thief" is the second single from Chevelle's album, Sci-Fi Crimes. It was released on December 7, 2009. Chevelle originally debuted this track on April 9, 2009 at a concert in Atlanta. Frontman Pete Loeffler said the song is about a personal experience for the band when their gear was stolen in Dallas, and his prized red PRS guitar seen in the video for "Send the Pain Below" was stolen, along with the rest of the band's gear, and returned by a man in California who returned the guitar to PRS after learning it was Loeffler's.

Critical reception
Loudwire ranked it the eighth greatest Chevelle song.

Music video
Mobile videos of the band recording "Letter from a Thief" were posted on the band's website on November 30, 2009.

On December 18, 2009, the music video premiered.

Charts

Weekly charts

Year-end charts

References

External links
 Video on YouTube

Songs about crime
Songs about letters (message)
2009 singles
Chevelle (band) songs
2009 songs
Songs written by Sam Loeffler
Songs written by Pete Loeffler
Epic Records singles